Jacskon McGreevy (born 21 April 1994) is an Irish hurler who plays as a midfielder for the Antrim senior team.

Born in Belfast, McGreevy first played competitive hurling whilst at school in St Mary's CBGS. He arrived on the inter-county scene at the age of seventeen when he first linked up with the Antrim minor team, before later lining out with the under-21 side. He made his senior debut in the 2013 National Hurling League. McGreevy has since gone on to be a regular member of the team, however, he has yet to claim any silverware.

At club level McGreevy plays with St Gall's.

Honours

Team

St. Mary's CBGS
O'Keeffe Cup (1): 2012

Antrim
Ulster Under-21 Hurling Championship (1): 2013 (c)
Ulster Minor Hurling Championship (1): 2011

References

 
 

1994 births
Living people
St Gall's hurlers
Antrim inter-county hurlers